A Feast for the Fallen is the debut album by English band Send More Paramedics, it was released in 2002.

Track listing

 "The Hordes" - 3:52
 "The Pain of Being Dead" - 1:19
 "Cannibal" - 2:50
 "Brains" - 0:11
 "Resurrection Cemetery" - 2:03
 "Kingdom of the Undead" - 2:49
 "Epulum" - 0:47
 "Necromancer" - 2:25
 "The Night Has a Thousand Eyes" - 1:47 
 "Zombie Sweetheart" - 1:58
 "Aim for the Head" - 0:08
 "Zombified" - 2:22
 "Untitled track" - 24:14

Samples and references

The chorus from the track "The Hordes" ("When there's no room left in hell, the dead will walk the Earth") is a reference to Dawn of the Dead
The title of "The Pain of Being Dead" is a reference to what Ernie is told by the 1/2 Woman Corpse in the 1985 Dan O'Bannon film The Return of the Living Dead, a movie of which the band is named after.
The sample used during the introduction to "Cannibal" is taken from the 1985 George A. Romero film Day of the Dead; specifically the death scene of the character Rickles.
The sample used as the introduction to "Brains" is taken from the film Return of the Living Dead Part II.
The sample used as the introduction to "Kingdom of the Undead" is taken from the 1968 George A. Romero film Night of the Living Dead.
"The Night Has a Thousand Eyes" uses theme music from the film The Return of the Living Dead.

Send More Paramedics albums
2004 debut albums